The Divine Legation of Moses is the best-known work of William Warburton, an English theologian of the 18th century who became bishop of Gloucester. As its full title makes clear, it is a conservative defence of orthodox Christian belief against deism, by means of an apparent paradox:  the afterlife is not mentioned in terms in the Pentateuch (i.e. Torah – see Jewish eschatology), making Mosaic Judaism distinctive among ancient religions; from which, Warburton argues, it is seen that Moses received a divine revelation.

The Divine Legation was published in two parts and nine books from 1738 by Warburton, who left it unfinished, however. It is a learned and discursive work, and excited extensive controversy in Warburton's lifetime, which the author pursued with acrimony. One side-issue, the history of writing, was treated by Warburton in a manner that proved influential.

A modern opinion, from J. G. A. Pocock, is that the book is a "strange and flawed work of undisciplined genius".

Reception timeline
1738 First part published.
1738 Warburton publishes a Vindication to an anonymous attack (by William Webster).
1741 Second part published.
1743 Reply from Thomas Bott. Thomas Chubb in An Enquiry Concerning Redemption  hit back at some comments of Warburton's.
1744 The section dealing with the origin of language is translated into French by Léonard de Malpeines, as Essai sur les hiéroglyphes des Égyptiens. Warburton issues the first part of a two-part reply to critics, to Conyers Middleton, Richard Pococke, Richard Grey; and also Mark Akenside, John Tillard, Julius Bate and Nicholas Mann.
1745 Warburton issues the second part of his reply to Arthur Ashley Sykes and Henry Stebbing.
1751 A German translation begins publication, and is reviewed by Gotthold Ephraim Lessing.
1766 In an anonymous work, Robert Lowth takes issue with Warburton, over a 1765 addition to the Divine Legation (appendix to book 5) concerning the Book of Job.
1770 Edward Gibbon attacks Warburton's interpretation of Æneid book VI.

References

1738 books
18th-century Christian texts
Christian theology books
Moses
Unfinished books